Michael Handelzalts (born 1950) is an Israeli theater critic.

Biography
Michael Handelzalts was born in Poland. His grandfather, Elyahu Handelzalc, was a teacher and writer from Warsaw, Poland who fled the city in 1939. He is believed to have been murdered by German troops in 
Novogrudok, along with 70 Jewish intellectuals who were rounded up and taken to an unknown destination.

Michael Handelzalts is a theater critic for Haaretz newspaper.  He was the founder and first editor of the paper's Book Review Magazine. He writes a weekly column for Haaretz, "Pen Ultimate."

See also
Israeli culture

References

Further reading
Handelzalts on Shakespeare

1950 births
Living people
Israeli journalists
Israeli theatre critics
Israeli editors
Israeli magazine editors
Polish emigrants to Israel
Israeli people of Polish-Jewish descent
Israeli Jews